Malik Jabir  (born 8 December 1944 in Wa) is a retired Ghanaian professional football striker. He is currently a technical advisor for Asante Kotoko S.C. in the Ghana Premier League.

Career
Jabir played club football for Asante Kotoko.

International career
Jabir also played for the Ghana national football team at the 1968 and 1972 Summer Olympics.

Coaching career
Following his playing career, Jabir coached Ghana in 2003. He also coached Asante Kotoko, ASFA Yennenga of Burkina Faso and Kano Pillars F.C. of Nigeria as Technical Adviser.

References

1944 births
Living people
Ghanaian footballers
Ghanaian football managers
Olympic footballers of Ghana
Footballers at the 1968 Summer Olympics
Asante Kotoko S.C. players
Expatriate football managers in Burkina Faso
Footballers at the 1972 Summer Olympics
1968 African Cup of Nations players
1970 African Cup of Nations players
Kano Pillars F.C. managers
Expatriate football managers in Nigeria
Ghanaian expatriate football managers
People from Upper West Region
Association football forwards